Grand Chess is a large-board chess variant invented by Dutch games designer Christian Freeling in 1984.  It is played on a 10×10 board, with each side having two additional pawns and two new pieces: the marshal and the cardinal.

  The marshal (M) combines powers of a rook and a knight.
  The cardinal (C) combines powers of a bishop and a knight.
Grand Chess uses the same pieces as the earlier variant Capablanca chess, but differs in board size, start position, rules governing pawn moves and promotion, and castling.

A series of Grand Chess Cyber World Championship matches was sponsored by the Dutch game site Mindsports.   Grand Chess tournaments were held annually beginning in 1998 by the (now defunct) correspondence game club NOST. 
Larry Kaufman has written that Grand Chess "really is an excellent game and deserves a bigger following".

Rules

The pieces are placed on the players' first and second ranks, respectively, with the rooks alone on the players' first ranks. The pawns are placed on the players' third ranks. Since the rooks are not blocked as much by the other pieces as in standard chess, it is easier for them to activate earlier in the game.

A pawn that reaches a player's eighth or ninth ranks can elect to either promote or remain a pawn, but it must promote upon reaching the tenth rank. Unlike standard chess, a pawn may be promoted only to a captured piece of the same colour. (So, it is impossible for either side to own two queens, or two marshals, or three rooks, etc.) If, and for as long as, no captured piece is available to promote to, a pawn on a player's ninth rank must stay on the ninth rank, but it can still give check.

As in standard chess: pawns can move one or two squares on their first move; pawns can capture en passant; checkmate is a win;  stalemate is a draw. There is no castling in Grand Chess.

Play examples

Vehre vs. Schmittberger, 2001

Played between John Vehre and R. Wayne Schmittberger at the 2001 Grand Chess Cyber Championship Final:

1.f5 f6 2.Nh4 Nh7 3.g4 g7 4.Nc4 Nc7 5.d4 d7 6.e5 Bd8 7.Rje1 Kd10 8.Kf1 fxe5 9.Ncxe5 Kc9 10.Re2? Kb9 11.Kg1 Rjf10 12.Bd3 e6 13.Rf1 Mh10?! 14.Nc4 Ci10 15.Nd6 exf5 16.Bxf5 Bd5 17.Ci1 Bxh4 18.ixh4 g6 19.Rfe1 gxf5 20.Nxf5! Qd8 21.Bxc7 Qxc7 22.Re9+ Kc10 23.Cxc7 bxc7 24.Qf4 d6 25.Qe3 Mg8 26.Me2 Nf6 27.Qe7 Nd7 28.Qe8+ Mxe8 29.Mxe8  [Annotations by Vehre]

Fool's mate

1.Cf4 Qd10 2.Ce6 Qf10 3.Cxc8

Composition

Embassy chess

Embassy chess is a variant of Grand Chess created in 2005 by Kevin Hill. It borrows the opening setup from Grand Chess and adapts it to the 10×8 board.  Except for the setup, the rules are as per Capablanca chess.

There are multiple chess engines that can play Embassy chess, including ChessV, Zillions of Games with a rules file, Sjaak 2, and Fairy-Stockfish.

Embassy chess can be played against other people on BrainKing and EvoChess.

Notes

References

Bibliography

Further reading

External links

 2001 Cyber World Championship game annotated by John Vehre
 Grand Chess: The Yerevan Games by Malcolm Horne 
 Christian Freeling's Grand Chess by Hans Bodlaender, The Chess Variant Pages

 Grand Chess a simple program by Ed Friedlander (Java)

Chess variants
Capablanca Chess variants
1984 in chess
Board games introduced in 1984